The Twin Bridge near Brownlee, Nebraska is a steel stringer bridge with a timber roadbed that was built in 1900 by the Wrought Iron Bridge Co. of Canton, Ohio.  Also known as the North Loup River Bridge and denoted as NEHBS No. CE00-223, it was listed on the National Register of Historic Places in 1992.

It brings a Cherry County road over the North Loup River, 7.9 miles northwest of Brownlee.

References 

Road bridges on the National Register of Historic Places in Nebraska
Bridges completed in 1900
Bridges in Cherry County, Nebraska
National Register of Historic Places in Cherry County, Nebraska
Steel bridges in the United States